Lil' Ed Williams (born April 8, 1955, Chicago, Illinois) is an American blues slide guitarist, singer and songwriter. With his backing band, the Blues Imperials, he has built up a loyal following.

Biography
In childhood, Williams and his half-brother James "Pookie" Young received encouragement and tutelage from their uncle, the blues guitarist, songwriter and recording artist J. B. Hutto, who introduced them to his student Dave Weld.  Together with Dave Weld,  (rhythm guitar and vocals) formed the first version of the Blues Imperials. Since 1989, the band's lineup has been Williams (lead guitar and vocals), Michael Garrett (rhythm guitar and vocals), James Young (bass) and Kelly Littleton (drums). Living Blues magazine described the band as "Rough-and-ready South and West Side blues...Ed's swirling, snarling slide guitar work can be riveting, and The Imperials pound out blues-rock riffs and rhythms behind him as if they're overdosing on boogie juice." Guitar Player called the band "a snarling boogie-blues machine."

A decade later, Alligator Records offered them the chance to record a track, "Young Thing", for a compilation album, New Bluebloods (1987). Producer and label owner Bruce Iglauer encouraged them to record additional material, and they cut a full album's worth of material at that session, released as Roughhousin (1986). 
They then appeared at music festivals and toured widely. Their second album, Chicken, Gravy & Biscuits, was released in 1989, and their third, What You See Is What You Get, in 1992. At this point the group disbanded. Williams issued two solo albums, Keep On Walking, on which he was joined by Dave Weld, a former member of the Blues Imperials, and Who's Been Talking (1998), pairing Williams with Willie Kent.

In 1999 the release of Get Wild marked the group's reunion. It was followed by Heads Up (2002), Rattleshake (2006), Full Tilt (2008) and Jump Start (2012).

Lil' Ed and the Blues Imperials have appeared multiple times at the Chicago Blues Festival and festivals and clubs around the world. In June 2008, Williams played on three tracks on Magic Slim & the Teardrops's album Midnight Blues. In June 2009, Williams was a guest on the radio quiz show Wait Wait... Don't Tell Me!, produced by Chicago Public Radio and National Public Radio.

Lil' Ed and the Blues Imperials have been nominated for eight Blues Music Awards as Band of the Year and have won that award twice.

Discography

Lil' Ed and the Blues Imperials
Roughhousin''' (1986), AlligatorChicken, Gravy and Biscuits (1989), AlligatorWhat You See Is What You Get (1992), AlligatorGet Wild (1999), AlligatorHeads Up (2002), AlligatorRattleshake (2006), AlligatorFull Tilt (2008), AlligatorJump Start (2012), AlligatorThe Big Sound Of.... (2016), Alligator

SoloKeep On Walkin (1996), Earwig MusicWho's Been Talking'' (1998), Earwig Music

See also
List of Chicago blues musicians

References

1955 births
Living people
American blues guitarists
American male guitarists
American blues singers
American male singers
Songwriters from Illinois
Singers from Chicago
Slide guitarists
Blues musicians from Illinois
Guitarists from Chicago
20th-century American guitarists
20th-century American male musicians
Earwig Music artists
Alligator Records artists
American male songwriters